The Raid on Beit Hanoun of 2004 or "Operation Forward Shield" was a 37 days long invasion and siege of Beit Hanoun in northern Gaza by the Israeli army, from 29 June to 5 August 2004. The stated goal was to prevent future rocket attacks from Gaza following the deaths of two residents of the Israeli town of Sderot on 28 June.

19 or 20 Palestinians were killed, including 6 children, and about 70 houses were destroyed.

Background 

Following the deaths of two residents of the Israeli town of Sderot on 28 June 2004, killed in a rocket attack by militants in occupied Gaza, the Israeli army started a raid on Beit Hanoun, dubbed "Operation Forward Shield". The stated goal was to prevent future rocket attacks from Gaza. The operation, ahead the planned unilateral withdrawal from Gaza, was preceded by Operation Rainbow (2004) and followed by Operation Days of Penitence.

The operation 

The raid started on 28/29 June 2004, around midnight, with a direct attack on the offices of local and international media. From an attack helicopter, 4 missiles were launched at the offices of inter alia BBC, Al Jazeera, CNN, the German broadcast ARD and Al-Jeel. It was the third Israeli attack against media in Gaza in less than 2 months. The IDF said it targeted "a structure which was used by the Hamas terrorist organization in Gaza City", that the building was "a communications center which maintained constant contact with terrorists" and that it had distributed "incitement material" from Hamas. Human Rights Watch and PCHR said it was a clear intent to silence local Palestinian media. The Committee to Protect Journalists (CPJ) wrote a letter Prime Minister Ariel Sharon, expressing its concerns.

On 29 June 2004, about 5 am, the Israeli army deployed its forces around Beit Hanoun in north-eastern Gaza. With tanks and helicopters, the IDF attacked Beit Hanoun and neighbouring areas. The operation caused large-scale damage and destruction to property and infrastructure. On 3 August, the IDF expanded the operation further west with tanks and other armoured vehicles. The whole period of 37 days, civilian movement into and out of the town as well as movement within the town was banned. After 37 days, the IDF began its redeployment, on 5 August at 1 am.

Casualties 

During the raid, 19 or 20 Palestinians were killed, including 6 children.

Damages 

With tanks and bulldozers, the Israeli army caused immense damage. According to PCHR, 70 houses were destroyed. Al Mezan reported 33 completely destroyed homes. Also factories and workshops were destroyed. The IDF damaged and destroyed schools, health and other public facilities, kindergartens, mosques, sewerage pumps and security posts. There was large-scale damage to infrastructure: water, electricity and sewerage networks and roads. Sixteen water-wells were destroyed.

Levelling of agricultural land by IDF bulldozers and tanks was one of the main components of operation "Forward Shield". Orchards were almost completely destroyed. In addition, 6 livestock farms were destroyed. Some 2,600-4,000 dunams of agricultural land were razed and destroyed.

Violation of international law 
According to the Palestinian Centre for Human Rights, the Israeli army was responsible for large-scale damage and destruction of civilian homes and infrastructure. They also accused them of systematically obstructing medical assistance saying a number of Palestinians died as a result. They also claimed that Ambulances, clinics and medical centres and medical crews were systematically attacked saying they were fired at and personnel were threatened.

Al Mezan said that the IDF occupied 36 homes and they systematically detained the inhabitants inside one room of the house, held them hostage and used them as human shield.

Al Mezan claimed that the siege constituted collective punishment of the entire population, calling it a breach of IHL and, especially, the 1949 Fourth Geneva Convention. Also the attacks on the press are considered a breach of international humanitarian law.

See also
 Operation Days of Penitence, 2004
 Operation Autumn Clouds, 2006

References

External links 

Beit Hanoun
Beit Hanoun
Israeli attacks against the Gaza Strip
Israel
Israel
Israel